Jordy Joao Monroy Ararat (born 3 January 1996) is a professional footballer who plays as a right-back or right midfielder for Colombian side Independiente Medellín. Born in Colombia, he represents the Armenia national team at international level.

Club career
Born in Bogotá, Monroy played from the age of 11 in the youth system of his hometown club Independiente Santa Fe. He made his debut on 1 November 2015 in Categoría Primera A, starting in a 1–1 home draw with Envigado. He totalled nine competitive appearances for the club, filling in when the regulars were rested ahead of continental fixtures, and was released in January 2016.

Following his release, he had an unsuccessful trial with a French Ligue 2 club, Patriotas Boyacá and a farm team of América de Cali, before becoming an Uber driver. He then had a choice between signing for Boyacá Chicó or Cúcuta Deportivo and chose the former, whom he helped win Categoría Primera B in 2017.

Boyacá Chicó were relegated back to the second tier at the end of the 2018 season. On 27 August 2019, Monroy scored his first senior goal to open a 3–2 home win over Cortuluá.

On 21 July 2020, Armenian Premier League club FC Noah announced the signing of Monroy. On 5 July 2022, Noah announced that Monroy had left the club after his contract had expired.

International career
Being an Afro-Colombian, Monroy qualified to play for Armenia through his mother Lucelia, who is an Armenian national of African-American heritage. He was called up for the first time in May 2018 ahead of friendlies against Malta and Moldova, and debuted against the former in a 1–1 draw on 29 May.

Career statistics

Club

International

References

1996 births
Living people
Footballers from Bogotá
Citizens of Armenia through descent
African-American soccer players
Armenian footballers
Armenia international footballers
Colombian footballers
Colombian people of Armenian descent
Armenian people of Colombian descent
Colombian people of American descent
Armenian people of American descent
Association football fullbacks
Categoría Primera A players
Independiente Santa Fe footballers
Categoría Primera B players
Boyacá Chicó F.C. footballers
Armenian Premier League players
Ethnic Armenian sportspeople
21st-century African-American sportspeople